Palazzo Soranzo Van Axel is a Gothic palace in Venice, Italy located in the Cannaregio district. The palace locates at the intersection of the Rio de la Panada and the Rio de Ca' Widmann.

History
The palace was erected between 1473 and 1479 for Nicolò Soranzo with material recovered from an ancient Byzantine palace of Gradenigo. It is possible that Soranzo was involved in the construction of the adjacent Church of Santa Maria dei Miracoli. The palazzo then passed to the families of Venier and Sanudo. Finally, in 1652, the palace became the property of the Van Axel, rich merchants from Axel, Netherlands. They were admitted to the Venetian patritiate in 1665.

The building was featured in the 1967 movie The Honey Pot. In recent years, Palazzo Soranzo Van Axel has been used for the Biennale and undergone exterior renovation.

Architecture
The palazzo looks apparently planless. The structure has two noble floors decorated by quadriforas supported by balconies. There are internal courtyards with external staircases. Of particular interest are L-shaped halls (porteghi) because of the double angle view on the intersection of the rivers. Also remarkable is the entrance gate on the Fondamenta de le Erbe, in original wood with bezel and the coat of arms of the Van Axel. A curious part of the building that closes its south part is a few meters wide: built certainly after the rest of the building, it rises above a detachment originally imposed by the Venetian court in a property dispute with the adjoining convent of nuns.

Gallery

References

Houses completed in the 15th century
Soranzo Van Axel
Gothic architecture in Venice